The 2002 Supercopa de España was two-leg Spanish football matches played on 18 August and 25 August 2002. It contested by Deportivo La Coruña, who were Spanish Cup winners in 2001–02, and Valencia, who won the 2001–02 Spanish League.

Match details

First leg

Second leg

References

Supercopa de Espana Final
Supercopa de Espana 2002
Supercopa de Espana 2002
Supercopa de España